Aşağı Bilnə (also, Ashagy Bil’nya and Nizhnyaya Bilinya) is a village in the Lerik Rayon of Azerbaijan. The village forms part of the municipality of Noda.

References 

Populated places in Lerik District